Celebration is the debut album by the South African musician Bheki Mseleku. It was on the short list of nominees for the 1992 Mercury Prize. Courtney Pine contributed to the album, which was recorded in two days.

Critical reception

The Plain Dealer deemed the album "a serious, heartfelt and a very enjoyable first effort."

AllMusic wrote: "While his percussive, slashing style is reminiscent of McCoy Tyner and Don Pullen, [Mseleku] has his own voicings, phrasing, rhythmic drive, and sound."

Track listing

References

 

1991 albums
World Circuit (record label) albums